Kate Sullivan (born June 19, 1976) is an American television show host, producer, and television news anchor. Sullivan was a co-anchor of the evening news for WBBM-TV in Chicago with Rob Johnson from September 2010 to September 2015. Sullivan won several awards, including an Emmy Award and the Associated Press First Place Award for Breaking News. She also anchored the morning and noon news at WCBS-TV in New York (2006–2010).

Early life and education 
Sullivan is originally from Lakeville, Massachusetts, and graduated cum laude from the University of Notre Dame.

Career 
Sullivan began her journalistic career in the Midwest at the CBS affiliate WSBT-TV in South Bend, Indiana, where she started as an intern and was promoted to a general assignment reporter. In 2000, she joined KATV, the Allbritton Communications Company owned ABC-affiliated television station in Little Rock, Arkansas, as a general assignment reporter.

In 2002, she was promoted to anchor Live at Five at KATV and, in 2003, she also added Channel 7 News at 6 p.m. and Channel 7 News nightside to her anchoring duties. While at KATV, Kate reported on 9/11 from Ground Zero in New York and presented stories about Arkansans who had lost loved ones during the tragedy. She covered the presidential run of General Wesley Clark and the opening of the Clinton Presidential Library which won the station a regional Emmy award. She also reported a series of stories from Honduras on the charitable work of the Arkansas-based non-profit Heifer International.

Sullivan joined the CBS team in 2006 and anchored CBS 2 News This Morning at WCBS-TV in New York. In addition to anchoring CBS 2 News This Morning with Maurice DuBois and CBS 2 News at Noon, she co-hosted and filled in as the newsreader at CBS' The Saturday Early Show with Chris Wragge, Lonnie Quinn, and Erica Hill.

In September 2010, Sullivan joined WBBM-TV in Chicago, where she worked until she left the station in September 2015.

In 2018, Sullivan became the executive producer and host of "To Dine For with Kate Sullivan" on American Public Television, PBS and Create.

Awards 
Sullivan has been named one of the Top 30 Irish Americans in Media by IrishCentral.com and has served as media spokesperson for the American Heart Association.

Personal life 
Sullivan is married to Michael Tillman.  In December 2014, the couple welcomed their first child, a son.

References

External links
 
 To Dine For with Kate Sullivan Web Site
 To Dine For with Kate Sullivan at Create
 To Dine For with Kate Sullivan at PBS

1976 births
Living people
Television anchors from New York City
New York (state) television reporters
American television journalists
American women television journalists
University of Notre Dame alumni
Television anchors from Chicago
21st-century American women